Chromosome 9 open reading frame 135 is a protein that in humans is encoded by the C9orf135 gene.

References

Further reading 

Human proteins